Salt River may refer to:

Rivers

Caribbean
 Salt River (Guadeloupe), a narrow sea channel separating Grande-Terre and Basse-Terre Island
 Salt River (Jamaica)

South Africa
 Salt River (Garden Route)
 Salt River (Western Cape)

United States
 Salt River (Arizona), the largest tributary of the Gila River
 Salado culture
 Salt River Pima–Maricopa Indian Community
 Salt River (California), an altered tributary of the lower Eel River, being restored
 Salt River (Kentucky)
 Salt River (Michigan), two rivers, one in Macomb County and one in Midland/Isabella counties
 Salt River (Missouri), a tributary of the Mississippi River in eastern Missouri, United States
 Salt River (United States Virgin Islands)
 Salt River (Wyoming)

Elsewhere
 Salt River (Canada), flows into the Slave River, near Fort Smith, Northwest Territories in Canada
 Salt River (Western Australia)

Populated places

United States
 Salt River, Kentucky, an unincorporated community
 Salt River, Missouri, an unincorporated community
 Salt River Township, Adair County, Missouri
 Salt River Township, Audrain County, Missouri

Elsewhere
 Salt River, Cape Town, a suburb in Cape Town, South Africa

Other uses 
Salt River (politics), a colloquial political slogan or catchphrase
Salt River railway station, in Salt River, Cape Town, South Africa
 Salt River Bay National Historical Park and Ecological Preserve, on St. Croix, United States Virgin Islands
 Salt River Range, a mountain range in western Wyoming, United States

See also
 Salt Fork Arkansas River
 Salt Fork of the Red River
 Salt Creek (disambiguation)
 Salt Lake (disambiguation)
 Rivière Salée (disambiguation)